Muhammad Najib Ar-Ruba'i (also spelled Al-Rubai) (1904–1965) was the first president of Iraq (Chairman of Sovereignty Council), from 14 July 1958 to 8 February 1963. Together with Abdul Karim Qassim, he was one of the leaders of the 14 July Revolution that toppled King Faisal II in 1958.

While Qassim became prime minister and held most of the power, Ar-Ruba'i was elected head of state with the title of Chairman of the Sovereignty Council. The Sovereignty Council had a representative from each of the communal/ethnic groups. Ar-Ruba'i represented the Sunni community.

In 1963, Qassim was deposed by another coup led by Abd as-Salam Arif. Ar-Ruba'i had to retire from politics. Ar-Ruba'i died in 1965.

References

1904 births
1965 deaths
Presidents of Iraq
Iraqi Military Academy alumni